Nathan Troy Blauvelt (born March 17, 1987), better known by his ring name Brody King, is an American professional wrestler, singer, and actor. He is currently signed to All Elite Wrestling (AEW), where he is a member of The House of Black and is one-third of the current AEW World Trios Champion with Malakai Black and Buddy Matthews in their first reign. 

King is a former triple champion across three promotions; he has held the ROH World Six-Man Tag Team Championship with PCO and Marty Scurll, the ROH World Tag Team Championship and NWA World Tag Team Championship with PCO, and the World Series Wrestling Tag Team Championship with Scurll. King and PCO also won the 2019 ROH Tag Wars tournament and the 2019 Crockett Cup. Outside of wrestling, he is the lead vocalist of the crossover thrash band God's Hate and has appeared in the sketch comedy series I Think You Should Leave with Tim Robinson.

Early life
Nathan Troy Blauvelt was born in Van Nuys, California, on March 17, 1987. Before beginning to train as a professional wrestler, he worked in the car park of the Kia Forum.

Professional wrestling career

Early career (2015–2016) 
Blauvelt was trained by the Santinos Bros Academy in Bell Gardens, California, and debuted in 2015. He began to work under the ring name Brody King as a tribute to both Bruiser Brody and Brodie Lee. In 2016, he participated in the All Pro Wrestling' Young Lions Cup, winning the tournament.

Major League Wrestling (2017–2018) 
King made his debut for Major League Wrestling (MLW) at their Never Say Never show on December 12, 2017, losing to Montel Vontavious Porter (MVP). Three months later, he would be eliminated in the first round of the MLW World Heavyweight Championship tournament by Shane Strickland. Then he would participate in the 40-man Battle Riot match, where he would be eliminated. On September 6, 2018, King wrestled his first match against PCO in MLW. The match resulted in a brawl and a double disqualification after around five minutes. His final match for MLW was on the Christmas 2018 edition of MLW Fusion, a taped match from their November tapings, where he lost a no-disqualification match to PCO ending their feud.

Independent circuit (2018–2019) 
In 2018, he made his debut for Pro Wrestling Guerilla (PWG) at Neon Knights, losing to Adam Brooks. At Time Is A Flat Circle he defeated Douglas James, Eli Everfly and Jake Atlas in a Fatal-4-Way match. He received a title shot against then-champion Walter at Threemendous V which he lost, but his performance was highly praised. He participated in the 2018 Battle of Los Angeles tournament where he defeated PCO in the first round, but was defeated by Trevor Lee in the second round. At their following event he lost to Timothy Thatcher.  Brody King wrestled next for PWG at their January 18, 2019, show Hand of Doom. He defeated Jungle Boy at the event.

On August 31, 2018, at All American Wrestling's AAW Defining Moment 2018 King won the AAW Heavyweight Championship from A. C. H.. He would successfully defend the title against Pentagon Jr. and Eddie Kingston before losing the title to Sami Callihan on December 29, 2018. On November 16 and 17 King appeared on two Game Changer Wrestling (GCW) events. The first night he defeated Hardcore Holly and the second night he lost a GCW Heavyweight Championship match against Nick Gage. In November 2018, King allied with Marty Scurll during a World Series Wrestling's tour, forming a tag team known as Villain Enterprises. They would win the WSW Tag Team Championship during that same tour. His last match of 2018 would be for Suburban Fight Pro against Darby Allin.

Along with PCO, King participated in the 2019 Crockett Cup tournament. King and PCO defeated Royce Isaacs and Thomas Laitmer in the finals to win the cup and the vacant NWA World Tag Team Championship.

Ring of Honor (2018–2021) 
On December 1, 2018, King signed an exclusive deal with Ring of Honor. He debuted for ROH at the December 15 tapings, forming Villain Enterprises with Scurll and PCO. King and PCO would then go on to win the 2019 ROH Tag Wars Tournament, and on March 15, they defeated The Briscoe Brothers in a Las Vegas street fight to win the ROH World Tag Team Championship at the ROH 17th Anniversary Show.  The following night, King, PCO, and Scurll defeated The Kingdom for the ROH World Six-Man Tag Team Championship during the Ring of Honor Wrestling tapings. This made King a double champion in ROH within a 24 hour span. PCO and King would lose the ROH Tag Team Titles to Guerrillas of Destiny in a Fatal 4 Way match also involving Los Ingobernables de Japón (EVIL and Sanada) and The Briscoes at G1 Supercard.  On January 11, 2020, Villain Enterprises would lose the Six Man Titles to MexiSquad (Bandido, Flamita, and Rey Horus). Villain Enterprises would quietly disband after this due to the COVID-19 pandemic and Scurll's departure from Ring of Honor after allegations during the Speaking Out movement as King and PCO both began focusing on singles competition. At Final Battle, King received a ROH World Championship match against Rush but was defeated after interference from La Bestia del Ring who struck him with a steel chair. On March 26, 2021, at ROH 19th Anniversary Show, King would unveil a new faction called Violence Unlimited consisting of Tony Deppen, Chris Dickinson, and Homicide as they attacked La Faccion Ingobernable.

New Japan Pro-Wrestling (2019–present) 
King's contract with ROH opened the door for him to make his debut for New Japan Pro-Wrestling (NJPW). His debut match happened on January 30, 2019, in a tag team match with Scurll against Killer Elite Squad at NJPW's The New Beginning in USA event. On February 2, he wrestled on the final day of the tour, going against ROH Television Champion Jeff Cobb. His next appearance for them would be in Japan, during the Best of the Super Juniors 2019 tour. He would team with Scurll to defeat Taiji Ishimori and Gedo. Brody King is currently wrestling on NJPW Strong program for the company.

All Elite Wrestling (2022–present) 
On the January 12, 2022, edition of AEW Dynamite, King made his All Elite Wrestling debut, aligning himself with Malakai Black by attacking The Varsity Blonds (Brian Pillman Jr. and Griff Garrison) and Penta El Zero Miedo to become the second member of Black's stable, the House of Black. At Revolution's buy-in show, the stable (joined by Buddy Matthews) would then win in a trios match against Death Triangle (Pac and Penta Oscuro) and Erick Redbeard.

At Revolution on March 5, 2023, The House of Black defeated The Elite (Kenny Omega, Matt Jackson, and Nick Jackson) to become the AEW World Trios Championship.

Other work

Music 
King is the lead vocalist of the hardcore band God's Hate.

Acting 
King had a role in the 2020 short film Heel, written by and starring fellow wrestler Ryan Nemeth. In 2021, he played a crazed professional wrestler called Mike "The Rock" Davis in an episode of the Netflix sketch comedy series I Think You Should Leave with Tim Robinson.

Personal life
Blauvelt has a son named Dante and a daughter named Tallulah.

Championships and accomplishments 
 AAW: Professional Wrestling Redefined
 AAW Heavyweight Championship (1 time)
All Elite Wrestling
AEW World Trios Championship (1 time, current) – with Malakai Black and Buddy Matthews
 Royal Rampage (2022)
 All Pro Wrestling
 Young Lions Cup (2016)
 National Wrestling Alliance
 NWA World Tag Team Championship (1 time) – with PCO
 Crockett Cup (2019) – with PCO
 Oddity Wrestling Alliance
 OWA Tag Team Championships (1 time) – with Tyler Bateman
 PCW Ultra
 PCW Tag Team Championship (1 time) – with Josef and Jacob Fatu
 Pro Wrestling Guerrilla
 PWG World Tag Team Championship (1 time, current) – with Malakai Black
 Pro Wrestling Illustrated
 Ranked No. 79 of the top 500 singles wrestlers in the PWI 500 in 2019
 Ring of Honor
 ROH World Six Man Tag Team Championship (1 time) – with Marty Scurll and PCO
 ROH World Tag Team Championship (1 time) – with PCO
 Tag Wars (2019) – with PCO
 ROH Year-End Award (1 times)
 Faction of the Year (2019) – 
 Santino Bros. Wrestling
 SBW Championship (1 time)
SBW Championship #1 Contenders Tournament (2017)
 SoCal Uncensored
 Southern California Rookie of the Year (2016)
 Southern California Wrestler of the Year (2018)
 World Series Wrestling
 WSW Tag Team Championship (1 time) – with Marty Scurll

References

External links

1987 births
21st-century professional wrestlers
All Elite Wrestling personnel
American heavy metal singers
American male professional wrestlers
Living people
Twitch (service) streamers
ROH World Tag Team Champions
ROH World Six-Man Tag Team Champions
PWG World Tag Team Champions
The House of Black members
NWA World Tag Team Champions
Villain Enterprises members
AAW Heavyweight Champions